Maksym Ivanovych Bilyi (27 April 1989 – 14 September 2013) was a Ukrainian football midfielder.

Career
He was born in Novomoskovsk, Dnipropetrovsk Oblast, Ukrainian SSR.

He played for Zorya Luhansk in the Ukrainian Premier League.

he was called up to Ukraine national under-21 football team.

He died on 14 September 2013 from a brain tumor. He was survived by a wife and two children.

References

External links 

 Official Website Profile
 

1989 births
2013 deaths
People from Novomoskovsk
Ukrainian footballers
Ukraine youth international footballers
Ukraine under-21 international footballers
FC Metalist Kharkiv players
FC Kharkiv players
FC Metalurh Zaporizhzhia players
FC Zorya Luhansk players
Ukrainian Premier League players
Association football midfielders
Deaths from brain cancer in Ukraine
Sportspeople from Dnipropetrovsk Oblast